The Mesedi was the personal bodyguard of the king of the Hittites. The Mesedi was led by the Gal mesedi, who held considerable prestige in Hittite society. The Mesedi were a unit of 12 spearmen who protected the king wherever he might go. They probably numbered more in total in order to protect the king at all hours. They were reinforced and probably monitored by another unit numbering 12, known as the "golden spearmen." The Mesedi's purpose was the protection of the king against assassinations, which was endemic to the Hittite nobility. They also played a prominent role during festivals.

Professor Christopher I. Beckwith has compared the Mesedi to other royal bodyguard units of Indo-European societies, generally referred to as Comitatus.

See also
 Mannerbund
 Anglo-Saxon military organization
 Huskarl
 Druzhina
 Hird
 Comitatus
 Al-Haras
 Gabiniani
 Somatophylakes
 Maryannu
 Varangian Guard
 German Guard
 Leidang
 Fyrd
 Thingmen

Sources

Hittites
Bodyguards